The European Media Art Festival (officially abbreviated as EMAF) is an annual festival and congress for film and media art which takes place every April/May in Osnabrück, Germany.

Overview
The festival offers its visitors a current overview of experimental films, installations, performances, digital art, and hybrid forms, ranging from personal and political subjects or formal experiments to provocative statements about media art and society. The Festival sees itself as a place of experimentation and a laboratory where extraordinary works, experiments and ventures are created and presented. It is the largest showcase of experimental short films and feature films, digital art, animation, and multimedia, in the world of media art, presenting as many as 250 works out of up to 2500 entries during an event attended by about 14,000 participants as of 2018. The festival has an "open policy" with room for projects ranging from "process-based experiments and technological innovations to dexterous crossovers between the media and genres." Students are included as filmmakers, exhibitors and visitors.

History 

The European Media Art Festival  started in 1981 as an experimental film workshop (the official organising body is still called the "Experimentalfilm Workshop"), with the intention of providing a platform of expression for innovative and experimental art from the genres of film, video, multimedia and new media. The first workshop was organised by the Department of Media Studies at the University of Osnabrück. In 1988, the "Film and Television Year" proclaimed by the European Economic Community offered an opportunity to expand the workshop into something greater. A team of students developed the concept under the new title "European Media Art Festival".

Notability 
The European Media Art Festival is well-covered in regional media, with summaries in national dailies and trade papers as well as in magazines on art, movies and multimedia; there is also commercial and public broadcast coverage in regional and national programmes. The Festival is considered one of the most important media art festivals in Europe (and worldwide), attended by German and European producers, European TV companies, representatives of festivals, academies, agencies and distributors, setting trends in the international media art scene, highlighting socially-relevant events and giving artists an opportunity to be heard and established, defining itself above all as the avant-garde of media art and promoter of young media creators.

The Festival has featured film retrospectives by important international artists such as Shelly Silver, Michael Snow, Peter Greenaway, Fernando Birri, Al Razutis and David Rimmer.

Awards
The European Media Art Festival has presented up to four awards and prizes each year (values as of 2018):
EMAF Award (€5,000), for a trendsetting work in media arts
Newcomer Award (€1,500)
Dialogue Award for the Promotion of Intercultural Exchange (€1,500), awarded by the German Ministry of Foreign Affairs (German: Dialogpreis des Auswärtigen Amtes)
German Film Critics Prize (Best German Experimental Film/Video, €1,000), awarded by the Association of German Film Critics (German: EMAF-Medienkunst-Preis der Deutschen Filmkritik)

The deadline for submission of material to be presented each year is in January.

Other activities
The Festival also functions as a distributor of experimental and media art works through cooperation with numerous cinemas and museums as well as the Goethe Institute's international affiliates, organising tour packages of films and videos through the Experimental Film Workshop, booked and presented in non-commercial cinemas, galleries, museums and other national and international cultural locations. These have included tours across Germany, other European countries, as well as to Australia, Brazil, China, Japan, Lebanon, Mexico, New Zealand, Russia and the U.S.

Themes 
Since 2000, the Festival has been organised according to a particular theme:
2000: //Now Future
2001: Inside Outside
2002: Colour
2003: Larger than Life
2004: Transmitter
2005: Document
2006: Smart Art
2007: 20 Years of Being Confused
2008: Identity
2009: The future lasts longer than the past
2010: Mash Up
2011: This is Media Art
2012: 25 years Jubilee
2013: Mapping
2014: We, the enemy
2015: Irony - subversive interventions in media art
2016: The Future of Visions: Don't expect anything
2017: Push - living in the hyper information age
2018: Report - notes from reality
2019: Wild grammar

References

External links 

Official website (English)
Official website (German)
European Media Art Festival on IMDb
European Media Art Festival on Vimeo
European Media Art Festival on Facebook

Art festivals in Germany
New media art festivals
New media art
Digital art
Digital media organizations
Festival organizations in Europe
Cultural organisations based in Germany